Lies of the Twins is a 1991 American made-for-television thriller film directed by Tim Hunter.

Plot
A fashion model embarks on a romantic affair with her psychiatrist. The relationship is thrown into question when the protagonist espies her lover with another woman. The man she sees winds up being his evil twin, further complicating matters.

Cast
Aidan Quinn as James McEwan / Jonathan McEwan
Isabella Rossellini as Rachel Marks
Iman as Cat (sometimes credited as Elie)
Claudia Christian as Felice
Richard Harrison as Jack Roth

Production
Lies of the Twins, which first aired on the USA Network, is based on the novel Lives of the Twins by Joyce Carol Oates, writing under the pen-name Rosamond Smith. In an interview, Oates indicated that the filmmakers "changed the plot quite a bit. I didn't watch it."

Much of the film was shot at Richard Harrison's beachfront home in Malibu. It was one of the first productions that supermodel Iman worked on during her maiden year in Hollywood.

Lies of the Twins was produced by Tim Zinnemann for MCA Television Entertainment (MTE). Mel Frohman and Walter Klenhard prepared the teleplay, with Howard Smith serving as editor. David McHugh provided the film score and Peter Paul Raubertas supplied the production design. Declan Quinn, brother of male lead Aidan Quinn, was in charge of cinematography.
It is known as Bugie allo specchio in Italy.

Home Video
Lies of the Twins was released on VHS in 1992 by MCA Universal.

Reception
The film was generally well-received by critics upon release.

Notes

References
Harris M. Lentz, Science Fiction, Horror & Fantasy Film and Television Credits: Supplement 2, Through 1993, Volume 4, (McFarland: 1994)

External links

Trailer

1991 television films
1991 films
1990s thriller films
Films directed by Tim Hunter
USA Network original films
Films produced by Tim Zinnemann
American drama television films
1990s American films